There are at least 30 named lakes and reservoirs in Garland County, Arkansas.One of the lakes is Lake Hamilton. Another one is lake Catherine

Lakes
According to the United States Geological Survey, there are no named lakes in Garland County.

Reservoirs

	Arkansas Noname 136 Reservoir, el. 
	Bethel Lake, el. 
	Big Lake, el. 
	Camp Clear Fork Reservoir, el. 
	Country Club Lake, el. 
	Desoto Lake, el. 
	Dillon Lake, el. 
	Forest Lake, el. 
	Fountain Lake, el. 
	Hot Springs Reservoir, el. 
	Lake Catherine, el. 
	Lake Coronado, el. 
	Lake Cortez, el. 
	Lake Desoto, el. 
	Lake Hamilton, el. 
	Lake Ouachita, el. 
	Lake Pineda, el. 
	Lake Segovia, el. 
	Nooner Lake, el. 
	O'Mahoney Pond, el. 
	Rector Lake, el. 
	Reynolds Lake, el. 
	Ricks Lake, el. 
	Ricks Pond, el. 
	Roberts Lake, el. 
	Sanderson Lake, el. 
	Sleepy Valley Lake, el. 
	Sleepy Valley Lower Lake, el. 
	Sleepy Valley Middle Lake, el. 
	Spring Lake, el. 
	Tailings Pond, el.

See also

 List of lakes in Arkansas

Notes

Bodies of water of Garland County, Arkansas
Garland